Marten Toonder (2 May 1912 – 27 July 2005) was a Dutch comic strip creator, born in Rotterdam. He was probably the most successful comic artist in the Netherlands and had a great influence on the Dutch language by introducing new words and expressions. He is most famous for his series Tom Puss and Panda.

Tom Puss/Oliver B. Bumble series

In 1931 after his final exams, Marten Toonder went to Buenos Aires with his father. Here he got acquainted with the work of the well-known Argentine artist and editor Dante Quinterno, who ran a studio producing comics. Quinterno's creations impressed him to such a degree that he decided to become an artist himself. His most famous comic series were the Tom Puss (Tom Poes in Dutch) and Oliver B. Bumble (Olivier B. Bommel in Dutch) series that appeared in a Dutch newspaper from 1941–86. It has a very characteristic format. Every day there were three drawings and an accompanying text (about a book-page long). It started out as a children's cartoon, but gradually became more relevant to adults. Nowadays his texts are considered literature by some critics, and Toonder received several literary prizes for them. He invented many new words and expressions and some of those are now widely used in the Dutch language. Many personalities in his comics have their own peculiar dialect of Dutch, for instance Prlwytzkofsky language of professor Prlwytzkofsky, an innovative mixture of Dutch and German. Due to this emphasis on language play, Toonder's work is difficult to translate. His drawing style is very detailed and might be compared to Pogo, with more room for background drawings, since there are no text balloons in the drawings. Apart from his eccentric use of language Toonder is also praised for satirical approach.

Personal details
Toonder was born in Rotterdam on 2 May 1912. He lived in Ireland from 1965 until the early 1990s. He was married to the cartoon artist Phiny Dick (1912–1990), who collaborated with her husband and on whose earlier created characters Ollie B Bumble and Tom Puss were based. In 1996, at the age of 84, he married the composer Tera de Marez Oyens, who died the same year. Together with his brother, author , he assisted his father, (Captain) Marten Toonder Sr., a seaman born in the Dutch northern province Groningen, to write a book about his life, in which Toonder Sr. describes many details about the closing era of professional cargo sailing, the Rotterdam Lloyd (Line to East Indies), the Holland America Line, and about pre-war Rotterdam.

Marten Toonder died in his sleep on 27 July 2005.

The Marten Toonder Prize (award of the 'Stichting Fonds voor Beeldende kunsten, Vormgeving en Bouwkunst') was an oeuvre prize awarded from 2009 to 2013 to a cartoonist who had made a contribution to Dutch culture. An amount of € 25,000 was attached to the prize.

Bibliography in Dutch language

Tom Puss/Oliver B. Bumble series

Autobiographical material
 Vroeger was de aarde plat (1992). Amsterdam: De Bezige Bij. .
 Het geluid van bloemen (1993). Amsterdam: De Bezige Bij. .
 Onder het kollende meer Doo (1996). Amsterdam: De Bezige Bij. .
 Tera (1998). Amsterdam: De Bezige Bij. .
 We zullen wel zien (2001). Amsterdam: De Bezige Bij. .

Biography
 Wim Hazeu: Marten Toonder Biografie (2012). Amsterdam: De Bezige Bij. .

Awards
 1982: Stripschapprijs, Netherlands
 1992: Tollensprijs, Netherlands
 1997: Adamson Gold Award for Lifetime Achievement, Sweden

References

External links

Biography
Toondertijd A Dutch site for collectors of Marten Toonders stories
Bommelzolder The one and only Toonder museum
Panda and the clocktower fight One of Toonder's Panda stories (in Norwegian)

 
1912 births
2005 deaths
Dutch comics artists
Dutch comics writers
Dutch illustrators
Dutch male writers
Artists from Rotterdam
Dutch animators
Dutch animated film producers
Dutch humorists
Dutch expatriates in Ireland
Dutch sailors
Dutch satirists
Writers from Rotterdam
Winners of the Stripschapsprijs